Parallelomma vittatum is a species of dung fly (insects in the family Scathophagidae).

References

Scathophagidae
Articles created by Qbugbot
Insects described in 1826